The Mayor of Athens is the head of the Municipality of Athens, the largest district of Athens.

Kingdom of Greece (1832–1924)

Second Hellenic Republic (1924–1935)

Kingdom of Greece (1935–1941)

Hellenic State (1941–1944)

Kingdom of Greece (1944–1974)

Third Hellenic Republic (1974–present)

 
Athens
Mayors